an-Nassariya is a Palestinian town in the Nablus Governorate in the North central West Bank, located 14 kilometers East of Nablus. According to the Palestinian Central Bureau of Statistics (PCBS), the village had a population of 1,354 inhabitants in mid-year 2006. The healthcare facilities for the surrounding villages are based in an-Nassariya, and the facilities are designated as MOH level 2.

References

External links
Survey of Western Palestine, Map 12: IAA,  Wikimedia commons  
An Nassariya Village profile, Applied Research Institute–Jerusalem, ARIJ
an-Nassariya, aerial photo, ARIJ

Nablus Governorate
Villages in the West Bank
Municipalities of the State of Palestine